Standing Buffalo 78 is an Indian reserve of the Standing Buffalo Dakota Nation in Saskatchewan. It is 8 kilometres north-west of Fort Qu'Appelle. In the 2016 Canadian Census, it recorded a population of 569 living in 184 of its 198 total private dwellings. In the same year, its Community Well-Being index was calculated at 59 of 100, compared to 58.4 for the average First Nations community and 77.5 for the average non-Indigenous community.

The reserve is located in the Qu'Appelle Valley, between Pasqua and Echo Lakes, on the north side.

See also
List of Indian reserves in Saskatchewan

References

Indian reserves in Saskatchewan
Division No. 6, Saskatchewan